Steven D. Smith (born June 23, 1964) is an American politician of the Republican party.  He is a member of the New Hampshire House of Representatives representing Sullivan County District 11.

Political career

Smith was first elected to the New Hampshire House in 2010 in Sullivan County District 5, and then Sullivan County District 11 (after redistricting) which includes the towns of Acworth, Charlestown, Goshen, Langdon, Lempster, and Washington.

In 2012, Smith introduced legislation that would have created a committee to study the feasibility of Personal Rapid Transit in the state.

In 2014, Smith was appointed Chairman of the House Transportation Committee, and previously served on the Labor, Industrial, and Rehabilitative Services Committee. In 2015, he was appointed by then-Governor Maggie Hassan to the Governor's Interagency Council on Homelessness.

In 2016, Smith was one of ten Legislators from across the country chosen to participate in the Council of State Governments Transportation Policy Academy. 
In 2018, Smith was appointed Chair of the commission to Study Autonomous Vehicles, elected Chair of the Sullivan County NH Delegation and was appointed as a member of the Electric Vehicle Charging Stations Infrastructure Commission.

In 2021, after the death of house speaker Dick Hinch, Smith was appointed deputy speaker by newly elected speaker Sherman Packard, the previous deputy speaker. As deputy speaker, Smith holds the second highest ranking leadership role of the chamber and would assume the speakership if the incumbent speaker became unable to occupy it.

Personal life

Smith is a classic car enthusiast, and a slot car hobbyist.

References

External links 

Rep. Smith web page
Project Votesmart - Rep. Steve Smith profile
Steve Smith campaign website

1964 births
Living people
Republican Party members of the New Hampshire House of Representatives
People from Charlestown, New Hampshire
People from Kew Gardens, Queens
21st-century American politicians